Lasker-DeBakey Clinical Medical Research Award is one of four annual awards presented by the Lasker Foundation. The Lasker-DeBakey award is given to honor outstanding work for the understanding, diagnosis, prevention, treatment, and cure of disease. This award was renamed in 2008 in honor of Michael E. DeBakey. It was previously known as the Albert Lasker Award for Clinical Medical Research.

List of past winners
1946 John Friend Mahoney, Karl Landsteiner (posthumously), Alexander S. Wiener, Philip Levine
1947 Thomas Francis Jr.
1948 not awarded
1949 Max Theiler, Edward C. Kendall, Philip S. Hench
1950 Georgios Papanikolaou
1951 Élise L'Esperance, Catharine Macfarlane, William G. Lennox, Frederic A. Gibbs
1952 Conrad A. Elvehjem, H. Trendley Dean
1953 Paul Dudley White
1954 Alfred Blalock, Helen B. Taussig, Robert E. Gross
1955 C. Walton Lillehei, Morley Cohen (de), Hoffmann-La Roche Research Laboratories, Squibb Institute for Medical Research, Irving Selikoff, Walsh McDermott, 
1956 Louis N. Katz, Jonas E. Salk, Arnall Patz
1957 Rustom Jal Vakil, Nathan S. Kline, Henri Laborit, Pierre Deniker, Heinz E. Lehmann, Richard E. Shope
1958 Robert W. Wilkins
1959 John Holmes Dingle, Robert Edward Gross
1960 Karl Paul Link, Edgar V. Allen
1961 not awarded
1962 Joseph E. Smadel
1963 Michael E. DeBakey, Charles Huggins
1964 Nathan S. Kline
1965 Albert B. Sabin
1966 Sidney Farber
1967 Robert Allan Phillips
1968 John Heysham Gibbon
1969 George C. Cotzias
1970 Robert A. Good
1971 Edward D. Freis
1972 Min Chiu Li, Denis Burkitt, Joseph H. Burchenal, V. Anomah Ngu, Edmund Klein, Emil Frei III, Emil J. Freireich, James F. Holland, Donald Pinkel, Vincent T. DeVita, Jr., C. Gordon Zubrod
1973 Paul M. Zoll, William B. Kouwenhoven
1974 John Charnley
1975 Godfrey N. Hounsfield, William Oldendorf
1976 Raymond P. Ahlquist, James W. Black
1977 Inge Edler, C. Hellmuth Hertz
1978 Michael Heidelberger, Robert Austrian, Emil C. Gotschlich
1979 not awarded
1980 Cyril A. Clarke, Ronald Finn, Vincent Freda, John G. Gorman, William Pollack
1981 Louis Sokoloff
1982 Roscoe O. Brady, Elizabeth F. Neufeld
1983 F. Mason Sones, Jr.
1984 Paul C. Lauterbur
1985 Bernard Fisher
1986 Myron Essex, Robert C. Gallo, Luc Montagnier
1987 Mogens Schou
1988 Vincent P. Dole
1989 Étienne-Émile Baulieu
1990 not awarded
1991 Yuet Wai Kan
1992 not awarded
1993 Donald Metcalf
1994 John Allen Clements
1995 Barry J. Marshall
1996 Porter Warren Anderson, Jr., David H. Smith (de), John B. Robbins, Rachel Schneerson
1997 Alfred Sommer
1998 Alfred G. Knudson Jr., Peter C. Nowell, Janet Rowley
1999 David W. Cushman, Miguel Ondetti
2000 Harvey J. Alter, Michael Houghton
2001 Robert Edwards
2002 Willem J. Kolff, Belding H. Scribner
2003 Marc Feldmann, Ravinder N. Maini
2004 Charles Kelman
2005 Alec Jeffreys, Edwin Southern
2006 Aaron T. Beck
2007 Alain Carpentier, Albert Starr
2008 Akira Endo
2009 Brian Druker, Nicholas Lydon, and Charles Sawyers
2010 Napoleone Ferrara
2011 Tu Youyou
2012 Roy Calne, Thomas E. Starzl
2013 Graeme Milbourne Clark, Ingeborg Hochmair, Blake S. Wilson
2014 Alim-Louis Benabid, Mahlon R. DeLong 
2015 James P. Allison
2016 Ralf F. W. Bartenschlager, Charles M. Rice, Michael J. Sofia
2017 Douglas R. Lowy, 
2018 John B. Glen
2019 H. Michael Shepard, Dennis J. Slamon, Axel Ullrich
2020 not awarded
2021 Katalin Karikó, Drew Weissman
2022 Yuk Ming Dennis Lo

See also

 List of biomedical science awards

External links
 - Official site

References

Laskar-DeBakey
Lasker Award